Edgar Gerardo Lugo Aranda (born 31 December 1984) is a Mexican former professional footballer.

A creative midfielder, Lugo is usually deployed as an attacking midfielder but can also play as a winger or second striker. His key attributes are his ball control, vision and passing ability. Lugo is known for his ability to assist and score goals. Before joining Tigres, he played for Cruz Azul, Puebla, Morelia and Santos Laguna.

Career

Clubs
He started his career with Cruz Azul Hidalgo and in 2006 he joined the first team Cruz Azul. On January 27, 2007, he made his official debut in the maximum circuit, the Primera División (First Division), now Liga MX, against Atlante F.C. in a 1–0 loss. He scored his first goal on October 14, 2007, at the Estadio Cuauhtémoc against Puebla FC.

In the Clausura 2008, under command of Sergio Markarian, Lugo had more opportunities to play. Cruz Azul was the runner-up of the Clausura 2008 tournament and Lugo scored four goals in that season. On 2010, he went on loan to Puebla. He scored for Puebla in their match against Atlante in the Apertura 2010. He also played for Puebla in their 2010 North American SuperLiga semi-final defeat to New England Revolution. He scored five goals with Puebla.

On 2011, he was transferred to Monarcas Morelia, on loan again from Cruz Azul. In Morelia, under the command of Tomás Boy, Lugo became a regular starter.  In the 2012 draft held in Cancun, Quintana Roo, Lugo was sold to Santos Laguna. On 2013, Lugo was transferred to Tigres UANL, where under the command of the experienced coach Ricardo Ferretti, he has regained the good level he showed in Morelia.

In January 2018 Lugo trained with new United Soccer League side Las Vegas Lights FC.

National team

After gaining momentum in Morelia, Lugo was called to play with Mexico by head coach José Manuel de la Torre. Gerardo's debut with the national team came on February 29, 2012, in a friendly match against Colombia held in Miami.

Personal
Lugo is married and has two children. His father Gerardo Lugo Gómez, was also a professional footballer who played as a midfielder.

Honours
Cruz Azul
 Copa Panamericana: 2007

Tigres UANL
 Liga MX: Apertura 2015
 Copa MX: Clausura 2014

Veracruz
 Copa MX: Clausura 2016

Querétaro
 Copa MX: Apertura 2016
 Supercopa MX: 2017

Herediano
 Liga FPD: Apertura 2018
 CONCACAF League: 2018

References

External links
 

1984 births
Living people
Footballers from Mexico City
Mexican people of Spanish descent
Cruz Azul footballers
Club Puebla players
Atlético Morelia players
Santos Laguna footballers
Tigres UANL footballers
C.D. Veracruz footballers
Querétaro F.C. footballers
Liga MX players
Mexico international footballers
Mexican footballers
Association football midfielders